The 2023 Nicholls Colonels baseball team represents Nicholls State University during the 2023 NCAA Division I baseball season. The Colonels play their home games at Ben Meyer Diamond at Ray E. Didier Field and are led by second–year head coach Mike Silva. They are members of the Southland Conference.

Previous season

The Colonels had an overall season record of 26–25 and a conference record of 12–12 finishing tied for fourth place in the Southland Conference.  They participated in the 2022 Southland Conference baseball tournament as the fourth seeded team.  After winning their first conference tournament game against Northwestern State, the Colonels' season ended after losing to first seed McNeese and eighth seed Incarnate Word.

Preseason

Southland Conference Coaches Poll
The Southland Conference Coaches Poll was released on February 3, 2023. Nicholls was picked to finish sixth in the Southland Conference with 59 votes.

Preseason All-Southland team
Four Nicholls Colonels players were named to the conference preseason first team.

First Team
Edgar Alvarez (NICH, JR, 1st Base)
Brad Burckel  (MCNS, SR, 2nd Base)
Josh Leslie (MCNS, SR, 3rd Base)
Parker Coddou (NICH, JR, Shortstop)
Bo Willis (NWST, JR, Catcher)
Tre Jones (TAMUCC, JR, Designated Hitter)
Payton Harden (MCNS, SR, Outfielder)
Brendan Ryan (TAMUCC, SR, Outfielder)
Xane Washington (NICH, R-SR, Outfielder)
Zach Garcia  (TAMUCC, SO, Starting Pitcher)
Grant Rogers (MCNS, JR, Starting Pitcher)
Tyler Theriot (NICH, SR, Starting Pitcher)
Burrell Jones (MCNS, SR, Relief Pitcher)
Alec Carr (UIW, SR, Utility)

Second Team
Josh Blankenship (LU, SR, 1st Base)
Daunte Stuart (NWST, JR, 2nd Base)
Kasten Furr (NO, JR, 3rd Base)
Tyler Bischke (NO, JR, Shortstop)
Bryce Grizzaffi (SELA, SR, Catcher)
Kade Hunter (MCNS, SR, Designated Hitter)
Josh Caraway (TAMUCC, JR, Outfielder)
Braden Duhon (MCNS, JR, Outfielder)
Issac Williams (NO, JR, Outfielder)
Cal Carver  (NWST, SR, Starting Pitcher)
Tyler LeBlanc (NO, JR, Starting Pitcher)
Will Kinzeler (SELA, JR, Starting Pitcher)
Dalton Aspholm (SELA, SR, Relief Pitcher)
Tre’ Obregon III (MCNS, SR, Utility)

Roster

Schedule and results

Schedule Source:
*Rankings are based on the team's current ranking in the D1Baseball poll.

References

Nicholls Colonels
Nicholls Colonels baseball seasons
Nicholls Colonels baseball